Tomboy is a term used for girls or young women with masculine traits. It can include wearing androgynous or unfeminine clothing and engaging in physical sports or other activities and behaviors usually associated with boys or men.

Origins
The word "tomboy" is a portmanteau which combines "tom" with "boy". Though this word is now used to refer to "boy-like girls", the etymology suggests the meaning of tomboy has changed drastically over time.

In 1533, according to the Oxford Dictionary of English, "tomboy" was used to mean a "rude, boisterous or forward boy". By the 1570s, however,  "tomboy” had taken on the meaning of a "a bold or immodest woman", finally, in the late 1590s and early 1600s, the term morphed into its current meaning: “a girl who behaves like a spirited or boisterous boy; a wild romping girl.”"

History

In the United States

19th century 

Before the mid-19th century, femininity was equated with emotional fragility, physical vulnerability, hesitation, and domestic submissiveness, commonly known as the "Cult of True Womanhood". Under the influence of this ideal of femininity, women of all ages squeezed their waists in extremely tight corsets, starved themselves, and did not engage in strenuous sports or any physical activity. They reduced themselves into subhuman beings in the family environment. This twisted paradigm remained stagnant until the mid-nineteenth century. During the Long Depression when American government regulation corrupted free trade in the  economy, the US's increasing economic instability made fragile femininity, until then quite widespread in the behavioral customs, no longer desirable. Young women joined the workforce to support their families and learn practical job skills, and thus a robust physique was needed to support the physical demands of job practices. This leads to the paradigm shift in people's expectations of young women from languishing, decorative beauty to vigorously healthy, thus laying the groundwork for tomboyism.

In Charlotte Perkin Gilman's 1898 book, Women and Economics, the author lauds the health benefits of being a tomboy, that girls should be "not feminine till it is time to be". Joseph Lee, a playground advocate, wrote in 1915 that a "tomboy phase" was crucial to physical development of young girls between the ages of 8 and 13. Coupled with the birth of first wave feminism and the US's depressed economy, tomboyism amongst young girls emerged because the young girls' parents permitted or even promoted the tomboy upbringing due to the decaying economy and the American turbulent political climate.

Late 19th century and Civil War 

During the American Civil War, American society fully realized the importance of healthy women. When hostilities of the North and South broke out and thousands of men fled to the battlefield, many adolescent girls and young women were pushed to be responsible for tasks that would be traditionally considered in the men's realm. Women who had not been allowed to have independent bank accounts were now expected to take care of the finances. American wives, mothers, and young girls who used to rely on the men in the household for security now had the duty of protecting their homes from the army. As a result, mothers focused on improving the physical constitution of their daughters while taking care of their own. Many women who had subscribed to the Cult of True Womanhood before the Civil War found themselves engaging in an array of masculine actions during it. In short, women were given the duties of men during the period of Civil War, leading to tomboyism.

20th century: Second wave feminism and gay liberation 

While first wave feminism mainly focused on women's suffrage, second wave feminism expanded the discussion of gender inequality in areas such as sexuality, family dynamics, workspace, and laws in relation with patriarchy and culture. With the main purpose of critiquing the patriarchal systematic injustice, this movement leaded to abortion victory, and opened avenues for gender minorities in education, employment, and legal protection against domestic violence. This created space for the gay liberation movement in the 1960s-1980s advocated against the societal shame on gay pride. With the advocates launching gay pride parades in the United States, Canada, Western Europe, Australia, and New Zealand, tomboys were liberated from their heteronormative duties of femininity and compulsory heterosexual relationships with men, especially those ones who identify as lesbians.

In the late 20th century, the term tomboy describes girls who wear unfeminine clothing, actively engage in physical sports, and embrace what are often known as "boy toys" such as cars, or other activities usually associated with boys.  The term is used less frequently than before in the West mainly because it is now a societal norm for adolescent girls to engage in physical activities, play with peers of the same and opposite gender, and wear comfortable clothing.

Psychobehavioral aspects

Child development 

Tomboy can be seen as a phase of gender presentation in adolescence. Some parents might be concerned by the lack of femininity in their child but the tomboy phase is, in fact, crucial to physical development between the ages of 8 and 13, according to Joseph Lee, the playground movement advocate in 1915. Some girls start to embrace femininity as age increases while some persist to be tomboys in adulthood.

Psychologists speculate that childhood tomboy behavior results from young child's innate curiosity combined with family dynamics and imposed societal gender roles and behavioral customs. The preference of athletics and masculine clothing can be explained by adolescent tomboys's curiosity about outdoors and physical games, by which comfortable clothing such as pants and jersey helps to facilitate their physical engagement. Some tomboys may view femininity as a compulsory label pushed on them, which results in negative feelings toward feminine acts. Masculinity may be seen as a defense mechanism against the parental and societal push toward femininity, shaping the child to detest what is typically defined as girl activity. A 2002 study suggests that some girls are "born tomboys" because of the higher testosterone levels of the mother during pregnancy.

A large proportion of tomboys grow up and start to embrace femininity or heteronormativity by wearing feminine clothing such as dresses and skirts and dating men. Being a childhood tomboy does not determine one's sexual orientation or life-long gender presentation.

Gender roles

The idea that there are girl activities and clothing, and that there are boy activities and clothing, is often reinforced by the tomboy concept. Tomboyism can be seen as both refusing gender roles and traditional gender conventions, but also conforming to gender stereotypes. The concept may be considered outdated or looked at from a positive viewpoint. Feminine traits are often devalued and unwanted, and tomboys often respond this viewpoint. This can be due in part to an environment that desires and only values masculinity, depending on the decade and geographical region. Idealized masculinity is atop the hegemony and sets the traditional standard, and is often upheld and spread by young children playing with one another. Tomboys may view femininity as having been pushed on them, which results in negative feelings toward femininity and those that embrace it. In this case, masculinity may be seen as a defense mechanism against the harsh push toward femininity, and a reclaiming of agency that is often lost due to sexist ideas of what girls are and are not able to do.

In western culture, tomboys are expected to one day cease their masculine behavior, usually during or right before puberty, return to feminine behavior, and are expected to embrace heteronormativity. Tomboys who do not do such are occasionally stigmatized, usually due to homophobia. Barbara Creed argues that the tomboy's "image undermines patriarchal gender boundaries that separate the sexes", and thus is a "threatening figure". This "threat" affects and challenges the idea of what a family must look like, generally nuclear independent heterosexual couplings with two children.

Gender scholar Jack Halberstam  argues that while the defying of gender roles is often tolerated in young girls, adolescent girls who show masculine traits are often repressed or punished. However, the ubiquity of traditionally female clothing such as skirts and dresses has declined in the Western world since the 1960s, where it is generally no longer considered a male trait for girls and women not to wear such clothing. An increase in the popularity of women's sporting events (see Title IX) and other activities that were traditionally male-dominated has broadened tolerance and lessened the impact of "tomboy" as a pejorative term.Sociologist Barrie Thorne suggested that some "adult women tell with a hint of pride as if to suggest: I was (and am) independent and active; I held (and hold) my own with boys and men and have earned their respect and friendship; I resisted (and continue to resist) gender stereotypes".

In the Philippines, tomboys are masculine-presenting women who have relations with other women, with the other women tending to be more feminine, although not exclusively, or transmasculine people who have relationships with women; the former appears more common than the latter. Women who engage in romantic relationships with other women, but who are not masculine, are often still deemed heterosexual. This leads to more invisibility for those that are lesbian and feminine. Scholar Kale Bantigue Fajardo argues for the similarity between "tomboy" in the Philippines and "tombois in Indonesia", and "toms in Thailand" all as various forms of female masculinity. In China, tomboys are called "假小子" (jiá xiao zi), which literally translates as "pseudo-boy". This term is largely used as a derogatory term to describe those girls with masculine characteristics. Most of the times calling someone a "假小子" is a humiliation which implies that the individual could not find a boyfriend. This largely reduces the value of women to only romance and diminishes girls' confidence in working in what is traditionally defined as the "boy's realm."

Sexual orientation

Association of tomboyism with lesbianism

During the 20th century, Freudian psychology and backlash against LGBT social movements resulted in societal fears about the sexualities of tomboys, and this caused some to question whether tomboyism leads to lesbianism. Throughout history, there has been a perceived correlation between tomboyishness and lesbianism. For instance, Hollywood films would stereotype the adult tomboy as a "predatory butch dyke". Lynne Yamaguchi and Karen Barber, editors of Tomboys! Tales of Dyke Derring-Do, argue that "tomboyhood is much more than a phase for many lesbians"; it "seems to remain a part of the foundation of who we are as adults". Many contributors to Tomboys! linked their self-identification as tomboys and lesbians to both labels positioning them outside "cultural and gender boundaries". Psychoanalyst Dianne Elise's essay in 1995 reported that more lesbians noted being a tomboy than straight women.

Misconception 
While some tomboys later reveal a lesbian identity in their adolescent or adult years, behavior typical of boys but displayed by girls is not a true indicator of one's sexual orientation.  With raising female liberation and gender-neutral playgrounds (at least in the US) in the 21st century, an increasing number of girls can technically be considered as “tomboys” without being referred as “tomboys” because it is mostly considered normal nowadays for girls to engage in physical activities, play equally with boys, and wear pants, masculine or gender-neutral clothing. The association between lesbianism and tomboyism is not only outdated but also disrespectful to both the girl and the lesbian community.

Representations in media

Tomboys in fictional stories are often used to contrast a more girly and traditionally feminine character. These characters are also often the ones that undergo a makeover scene in which they learn to be feminine, often under the goal of getting a male partner. Usually with the help of the more girly character, they transform from an ugly duckling into a beautiful swan, ignoring past objectives and often framed in a way that they have become their best self. Doris Day's character in Calamity Jane is one example of this; Allison from The Breakfast Club is another. Tomboy figures who do not eventually go on to conform to feminine and heterosexual expectations often simply remain in their childhood tomboy state, eternally ambiguous. The stage of life where tomboyism is acceptable is very short and rarely are tomboys allowed to peacefully and happily age out of it without changing and without giving up their tomboyness.

Tomboyism in fiction often symbolizes new types of family dynamics, often following a death or another form of disruption to the nuclear family unit, leading families of choice rather than a descent. This provides a further challenge to the family unit, including often critiques of socially who is allowed to be a family – including critiques of class and often a women's role in a family. Tomboyism can be argued to even begin to normalize and encourage the inclusion of other marginalized groups and types of families in fiction including, LGBT families or racialized groups. This is all due to the challenging of gender roles, and assumptions of maternity and motherhood that tomboys inhabit.

Tomboys are also used in patriotic stories, in which the female character wishes to serve in a war, for a multitude of reasons. One reason is patriotism and wanting to be on the front lines. This often ignores the many other ways women were able to participate in war efforts and instead retells only one way of serving by using one's body. This type of story often follows the trope of the tomboy being discovered after being injured, and plays with the particular ways bodies get revealed, policed and categorized. This type of story is also often nationalistic, and the tomboy is usually presented as the hero that more female characters should look up to, although they still often shed some of their more extreme ways after the war.

See also

Androgyny
Effeminacy
En homme
Geek girl
Gender bender
Gender variance
Girly girl
Non-binary gender
Phallic woman
Queer heterosexuality
Sex and gender distinction
Sissy
Social construction of gender
Victorian dress reform
Trousers as women's clothing
Hatshepsut
Joan of Arc
Wartime cross-dressers

References

External links

 Tomboys and sissies: Androgynous children?
 Tomboys! Feisty Girls and Spirited Women A film by Julie Akeret and Christian McEwen

Androgyny
Female stock characters
Female gender nonconformity
Gender nonconformity
Gender roles
Girls
Slang terms for women
Stereotypes of women
Terms for women
Youth rights